Knema kinabaluensis is a species of plant in the family Myristicaceae. It is endemic to Borneo where it is confined to Sabah.

References

kinabaluensis
Endemic flora of Borneo
Flora of Sabah
Trees of Borneo
Conservation dependent plants
Near threatened flora of Asia
Taxonomy articles created by Polbot
Taxa named by James Sinclair (botanist)